DN28 is a national road in Romania, located entirely within the historical region of Moldavia. The road starts in Săbăoani, near Roman and crosses through the cities of Târgu Frumos and Iași, ending in Albița, near the border with Moldova.

Between Săbăoani and Iași, the road is part of the European route E583 of the International E-road network. Similarly with DN2 between Bucharest and Săbăoani, the Săbăoani – Iași segment of DN28 has one lane per direction with one narrow emergency lane. The rest of the road is a simple two-lane road.

See also
Roads in Romania
Transport in Romania

References

Roads in Romania